Boechera platysperma, the pioneer rockcress or broad-seeded rock-cress, is a perennial plant in the family Brassicaceae found in western United States mountains.

Habitat and range

Leaves and stems
Leaves are entire.

Inflorescence and fruit
Flowers are 4-petaled and spoon shaped. Seed pods are flat.

References

platysperma